Beech-Nut Nutrition Corporation is a baby food company owned by the Swiss branded consumer-goods firm Hero Group.

History 

Beech-Nut's roots go back to 1891, to the Mohawk Valley town of Canajoharie, New York. Raymond P. Lipe, along with his friend John D. Zieley and their brothers, Walter H. Lipe and David Zieley, and Bartlett Arkell, founded The Imperial Packing Co. for the production of Beech-Nut ham. The product was based on the smoked hams of the Lipes' father, farmer Ephraim Lipe. The company's principal products were ham and bacon for the first seven years. The Zieleys sold their shares to the Lipe brothers in 1892.

The company was incorporated as the Beech-Nut Packing Company in 1899. Arkell was the first president of the company. In 1900, the company's sales were $200,000. Engineers from Beech-Nut patented the first vacuum jar, with a design that included a gasket and top that could remain intact in transit and became a standard of the industry .

During the first 25 years of the 20th century, the company expanded its product line into peanut butter, jam, pork and beans, ketchup, chili sauce, mustard, spaghetti, macaroni, marmalade, caramel, fruit drops, mints, chewing gum, and coffee.

Timeline
1891: Founded as the Imperial Packing Company.
1910: Beech-Nut Chewing Gum line launched by director Frank Barbour
1927: Loses a trademark infringement case at the Supreme Court against Lorillard Tobacco Company concerning their Beechnut chewing-tobacco brand.
1956: Life Savers Limited merged with Beech-Nut.
1968: Beech-Nut Life Savers merged with Squibb (part of the Olin Corporation) to form the Squibb Beech-Nut Corporation.
1973: Part of the company that sold only baby food was sold to a group led by lawyer Frank C. Nicholas. 
1976: Beech Nut becomes the first baby food company to remove added salt, in addition to added refined sugar, beginning the "natural" baby food movement. 
1979: Nicholas sold the baby food company to Nestlé.
1981: Nabisco acquired Life Savers (which includes the Beech-Nut candy line) from the E.R. Squibb Corporation.
1985: Beech-Nut began testing its products' ingredients for environmental contaminants, such as heavy metals and pesticides.
1987: Beech-Nut Nutrition Corporation paid US$2.2 million, then the largest fine issued, for violating the Federal Food, Drug, and Cosmetic Act by selling artificially flavored sugar water as apple juice. John F. Lavery, the company's vice president for operations was convicted in criminal court and sentenced to a year and a day in jail; Niels L. Hoyvald, the president of the company, also convicted, served six months of community service. Each of them also paid a $100,000 fine.
1989: Ralston Purina acquired Beech-Nut from Nestlé.
1998: Milnot Holding Corporation, one of the portfolio of companies owned by the private equity investment firm Madison Dearborn Partners, acquired Beech-Nut from Ralcorp Holdings (a spin-off of Ralston Purina). A potential merger with H.J. Heinz Co. was successfully challenged by the Federal Trade Commission and never consummated. 
2002: Beech-Nut becomes the first baby food manufacturer to produce a line of baby food with DHA and ARA, two essential fatty acids found naturally in breast milk.
2005: Madison Dearborn sold Milnot, and Beech-Nut along with it, to the Swiss branded consumer-goods firm Hero Group.
2007: Beech-Nut announced its intentions to move all of its manufacturing and corporate operations to the town of Florida, New York, a town close to Amsterdam, NY. 
2012: Jeff Boutelle named CEO of Beech-Nut
2014: Beech-Nut launched Beech-Nut Naturals, a line inspired by homemade baby food.
2015: Beech-Nut announced a recall of approximately 1,920 pounds of baby food products after receiving a single report of a small glass piece found in a jar of its baby food.
2017: Mark Rodriguez named CEO of Beech-Nut
2018: Beech-Nut began its support for No Kid Hungry, a division of Share Our Strength, which works to end childhood hunger in the United States. From 2018 to 2023, Beech-Nut will have donated over 6 million meals to kids and families. 
2019: Beech-Nut co-founded the Baby Food Council, alongside academic, government, and NGO partners to take on the challenge of reducing heavy metals in young children’s food. Founding members were Plum Organics, Cornell University, Environmental Defense Fund, Gerber Products Company, The Hain Celestial Group (Earth’s Best), Happy Family Organics, and Healthy Babies Bright Futures. The U.S. Department of Agriculture and the U.S. Food and Drug Administration served as technical advisors. 
2020: Dianne Jacobs named CEO of Beech-Nut.
2022: Beech-Nut says they test every ingredient lot it receives for up to 255 environmental contaminants.

References

External links
 
 The Story of a Pantry Shelf: An Outline History of Grocery Specialties. New York: Butterick Publishing Co., 1925.
 An excerpt about Beech-Nut,  from The Story of a Pantry Shelf, via the Library of Congress website
 Beech-Nut and Life Savers in Canada, from an Industry Canada website
 Frank C. Nicholas biography, 1970s-era co-owner of Beech-Nut 
 Milnot Holding Corporation
 Madison Dearborn Partners

Condiment companies of the United States
Companies based in New York (state)
American companies established in 1899
Food and drink companies established in 1899
1899 establishments in New York (state)
Private equity portfolio companies
American brands
Montgomery County, New York
Baby food manufacturers